Sundowner is an American mostly acoustic project of Chris McCaughan of The Lawrence Arms, also featuring Jenny Choi, Neil Hennessy, and Eli Caterer.

Their debut album, Four One Five Two, was released on Red Scare Records on March 13, 2007. Asian Man Records released the second Sundowner album We Chase the Waves on August 10, 2010.

Sundowner toured with Mike Park through the UK and Europe in February and March 2008.  During live shows, Sundowner is also known to cover Lawrence Arms songs.

Sundowner is currently signed to Fat Wreck Chords, and his third full-length album was released on September 3, 2013.

Band members
Chris McCaughan - Lead Vocals, Acoustic Guitar
Jenny Choi - Cello, Keys, Vocals
Neil Hennessy - Bass, Vocals
Eli Caterer - Electric Guitar

Discography

Albums
 Four One Five Two (2007) Red Scare Industries
 We Chase the Waves (2010) Asian Man Records
 Neon Fiction (2013) Fat Wreck Chords

Live album
 Little Elephant Sessions (2014) Fat Wreck Chords

Compilation album
 Rock Against Malaria (2009) Eunuch Records

Music videos

External links
 Sundowner's MySpace page
 Sundowner Interview

Rock music groups from Illinois
Asian Man Records artists
Musical groups from Chicago
Folk punk groups